"The Light Is Coming" (stylized in all lowercase) is a song by American singer Ariana Grande, featuring American rapper Nicki Minaj, released on June 20, 2018 as a promotional single of Grande's fourth studio album Sweetener. Nicki Minaj wrote her intro while Ariana Grande co-wrote the song with its producer Pharrell Williams. The track debuted at number 95 and peaked at number 89 on the US Billboard Hot 100.

Release
On May 27, 2018, Ariana Grande teased "The Light Is Coming" with a 21-second clip on her Instagram page. On June 2, she debuted a preview of the song at Wango Tango, announcing that the song would be released on June 20, 2018, along with the pre-order of Sweetener.

Composition and lyrics
The song runs for three minutes and forty-eight seconds. It is a new wave and dance track with influences of R&B and hip hop. The sound is backed by Grande's vocals, singing, "The light is coming to give back everything the darkness stole". The song contains a "jittery beat" that is used with quick drums and synths. The song samples a CNN archive clip of a man named Craig Miller who is shouting at former senator Arlen Specter at a town hall meeting in Pennsylvania in 2009 concerning healthcare ("You wouldn't let anybody speak for this and instead!"). Pharrell Williams has prominently used the sample in other songs he has produced, including N.E.R.D and Rihanna's "Lemon" and Usher's "Twisted".

Grande's vocals span one octave, from G3 to G4.

Critical reception

"The Light Is Coming" received lukewarm reviews from music critics. Mike Nied of Idolator described it as "a serious dance floor filler", writing: "The light is coming to give back everything the darkness stole," [Grande] chants over militaristic drums and slippery synths. Her voice is confident and sounds perfectly at home as it races over the searing production, courtesy of Pharrell. All things considered, it sounds like the pop princess has another hit on her hands." In the album review, however, Neid called it "a particularly glaring misstep." Spin editor Israel Daramola described the song as a "glitchy, thumping" dance record with a sample that highlights Grande's "nursery rhyme-style melody" during the repeated chorus and her voice "is alive with feeling and thrives in the quirks and constant vibrancy of the music." He also praised Minaj for delivering a "strutting, paint-by-numbers verse in the time allotted" that is "perfectly suited to the heavy, ground shaking bass of the song". Brittany Spanos of Rolling Stone considered it a "weak spot" in the parent album.

Commercial performance
"The Light Is Coming" entered the US Billboard Hot 100 at number 95 selling 14,000 copies in its first week, allowing it to also debut on the Digital Songs chart at number 22. The song fell off the Hot 100 the following week; however, it later re-entered at a new peak of number 89 following the release of  Sweetener.

Worldwide, the song debuted in the top-forty in Hungary and Scotland, peaking at numbers 24 and 22 respectively, while charting within the top 100 in six other territories including the United Kingdom, where it reached number 57 on the UK Singles Chart. It also peaked at number 63 on the Canadian Hot 100.

Music video
Despite the song not being released as an official single, the music video for the song first premiered twelve hours after the song's release, via the Reebok official website. It was directed by Dave Meyers, who had also directed the music video for Grande's "No Tears Left to Cry", and features 
Nicki Minaj performing her verse and Ariana Grande singing in a dimly-lit forest. The video was released worldwide on YouTube and Vevo the next day.

Live performances
Grande performed a preview of the song at Wango Tango on June 2, 2018 and was on the set list of her Sweetener World Tour.

Credits and personnel
Recording and management
 Recorded at Glenwood Place Studios (Burbank, California), Jungle City Studios (New York City), Chalice Recording Studios (Hollywood, California), The Lunchtable (Los Angeles, California and Conway Recording Studios (Hollywood, California)
 Nicki Minaj's vocals recorded at Germano Studios (New York City, New York)
 Mastered at Sterling Sound (New York City, New York)
 EMI Pop Music Publishing/More Water From Nazareth (GMR), Harajuku Barbie Music/Money Mack Music/Songs of Universal, Inc. (BMI), Universal Music Group Corp. (ASCAP)/GrandAriMusic (ASCAP)

Personnel

Ariana Grande – lead vocals, songwriting
Nicki Minaj – featured vocals, songwriting
Pharrell Williams – songwriting, production
Mike Larson – recording, digital editing, arrangement, additional programming
Jacob Dennis – recording assistant
Ramon Rivas – recording assistant
Brendan Morawski – recording assistant
Thomas Cullison – recording assistant
Ben "Bengineer" Sedano – recording assistant
Aubry "Big Juice" Delaine – Nicki Minaj's vocals recording
Kris Crawford – Nicki Minaj's recording assistant
Manny Park – Nicki Minaj's recording assistant
Manny Marroquin – mixing
Scott Desmarais – mix assistant
Chris Galland – mix assistant
Robin Florent – mix assistant
Randy Merrill – mastering

Credits adapted from the liner notes of Sweetener.

Charts

References

2018 songs
Ariana Grande songs
Nicki Minaj songs
Song recordings produced by Pharrell Williams
Songs written by Ariana Grande
Songs written by Nicki Minaj
Songs written by Pharrell Williams
Music videos directed by Dave Meyers (director)
Female vocal duets